The Scala dei Turchi (Italian: "Stair of the Turks" or “Turkish Steps”) is a rocky cliff on the coast of Realmonte, near Porto Empedocle, southern Sicily, Italy. It has become a tourist attraction, partly due to its mention in Andrea Camilleri's series of detective stories about Commissario Montalbano.

The Scala is formed by marl, a sedimentary rock with a characteristic white color, formed from the tests of planktonic foraminifera. They belong to the Trubi Formation, a marine sedimentary unit of Lower Pliocene (Zanclean) age, which were deposited after the Zanclean flood, in which the Mediterranean refilled after having previously nearly completely desiccated during the Messinian salinity crisis. The cliffs lie between two sandy beaches and are a limestone rock formation in the shape of a staircase, hence the name. The latter part of the name derives from the frequent piracy raids by the Saracens during the Middle Ages, and Barbary pirates and, by convention, Turks during the Early modern period; the Turkish pirates, in fact, found shelter in this area less beaten by the winds and represented a safer landing and boarding place.

In August 2007 the municipality of Realmonte applied for the inclusion of the Scala dei Turchi (together with the nearby Roman Villa Aurea) in the UNESCO Heritage List.

In February 2020, following years of complaints about the poor environmental protection of the site from erosion and vandalism by tourists, Italian prosecutors seized control of the site. They ordered its temporary closure for monitoring and announced that they were investigating a man who claimed ownership of the site in a dispute with the Realmonte local authority.

In January 2022 the site was stained red by vandals.

References

Landforms of Sicily
Tourist attractions in Sicily
Landforms of Italy
Cliffs of Europe

External links 
A guide to visiting Scala dei Turchi